Adelaide T. Lambert (October 27, 1907 – April 17, 1996), also known by her married name Adelaide Ballard, was an American competition swimmer who earned a gold medal as a member of winning U.S. team in the women's 4×100-meter freestyle relay at the 1928 Summer Olympics, setting a new world record in the process.  Lambert was the Amateur Athletic Union (AAU) champion in freestyle, backstroke, and the individual medley events.

See also
 List of Olympic medalists in swimming (women)
 World record progression 4 × 100 metres freestyle relay

References

External links

 

1907 births
1996 deaths
People from Panamá District
American female freestyle swimmers
World record setters in swimming
Olympic gold medalists for the United States in swimming
Swimmers at the 1928 Summer Olympics
Medalists at the 1928 Summer Olympics
20th-century American women
20th-century American people